Bastard Out of Carolina is a 1996 American drama film made by Showtime Networks, directed by Anjelica Huston.  It is based on the 1992 novel by Dorothy Allison and adapted for the screen by Anne Meredith. Jena Malone stars in her debut as a poor, physically abused and sexually molested girl.

In 1997, the theatrical and video releases of the film were banned by Canada's Maritime Film Classification Board. The video was eventually granted release upon appeal.

The film won an Emmy Award for Outstanding Casting for a Miniseries or a Special (Linda Lowy) and was nominated for Outstanding Directing for a Miniseries or a Special (Anjelica Huston), Outstanding Supporting Actress in a Miniseries or a Special (Glenne Headly), and Outstanding Made for Television Movie (Amanda DiGiulio, Gary Hoffman). It was screened in the Un Certain Regard section at the 1996 Cannes Film Festival.

Plot
Ruth Anne "Bone" Boatwright, is a young girl growing up in Greenville, South Carolina in the 1950s. Born out of wedlock to Anney, Bone lives with her mother and their extended family in a poor part of town. Anney loves Bone, but is still very much a child herself, tired out from working and needy for both attention and adoration. Bone and Anney nearly always have to face the shame of the "ILLEGITIMATE" stamp on Bone's birth certificate. When the county courthouse burns down, Anney is happy that a copy of Bone's birth certificate no longer exists.

After her kind, hardworking first husband, Lyle Parsons, the father of Bone's half-sister, is killed in an automobile accident, Anney remarries a man named Glen Waddell, who seems attentive until Anney and Glen's baby dies at birth. Glen first molests Bone while waiting in the car for the birth of his child. Frustrated by the loss of his eagerly-anticipated son, Anney's inability to have more children, and his own inability to manage his temper as well as maintain steady employment, Glen begins to physically and sexually abuse Bone regularly; beating her in the bathroom. Bone wakes her mother in the middle of the night, barely able to walk because of the immense pain she is in. Anney takes her to the hospital, where the doctor berates Anney for beating the child so badly that her coccyx is broken. The only thing Bone says is 'Mama.' Anney takes Bone to the car, leaving the hospital against the doctor's wishes, and slaps Glen's hand away as he tries to comfort the girl. Anney is saddened and angered by her new husband's behavior towards her child and takes Bone to her sister Alma's house to recuperate. However, once Bone is better, Anney returns to Glen after he swears to never touch Bone again. Yet the abuse resumes not long after.

While reading with her mama at the cafe, Anney asks Bone to go and stay with her Aunt Ruth since she is very sick. Ruth asks Bone about Glen and if he has ever hurt her. Bone says no and the two grow close listening to gospel music on the radio. After a visit from Dee Dee, Ruth dies of sickness. At Aunt Ruth's funeral, Bone's Aunt Raylene finds her in the bathroom falling over drunk after drinking too much alcohol and when she tries to take her to a bed, she discovers lashes on her legs and alerts the girl's uncles, Earle, Wade, and Travis, and a man, who beat Glen unconscious for what he did to her. Bone is sent to live with her aunts, and eventually tells her mother that she is allowed to love Glen, but Bone will never come home to him again. 

Eventually, Glen comes around while the aunts are out, trying to force Bone to come back. But she refuses, asks him to leave, then threatens to tell Anney everything he's done to her. 

When Bone fights back, Glen punches, and then rapes her, breaking her arm. Anney discovers the rape and retaliates by beating Glen over the head with a glass bottle, breaking it and resulting in him bleeding from his head. She pulls, kicks, and hurls him off of Bone, screams at him, then carries her daughter out of the house away from him and to her car. 

Glen stumbles out of the house after Anney, screaming his apologies and saying he can't live without her. She yells at him to stay away from her and Bone. She then puts Bone into her car. When Glen tries to comfort her, she pushes him away, gets into her car, starts it and tries to drive away, attempting to leave him for good. Glen then leans against the car door and repeatedly smashes his head against it, screaming for Anney to kill him if he can't be with her anymore. Instead, she strokes his head in forgiveness, believing he will never hurt Bone again. This causes Bone to feel disgusted and amazed, making her for the first time hate her own mother. Ultimately, Anney returns to Glen.

Moments after, Bone is visited at the hospital by Aunt Raylene. When the cops attempt to question her about who brutalized her, she still refuses to reveal that it was Glen and calls out for her mother who is nowhere to be found. 

In the end, Bone is allowed to stay with her Aunt Raylene and Uncle Earle, far away from the reach of those who would harm her. Her mother visits one final time to deliver to her the copy of her birth certificate without the mark of "ILLEGITIMATE" and apologizes for what happened, saying that she loved Glen too much to see the real him and she tells Bone that she loves her, before ultimately driving away to rejoin Glen. Bone remains with her Aunt Raylene and Uncle Earle, and with this final, tearful goodbye, she cries for her mother's sacrifice and for the freedom she has at last achieved. Her final words are narrated by Laura Dern as the film ends:

"Who had mama been? What did she wanted to be or do before I was born? Once I was born, her hopes turned, and I climbed up her life like a flower reaching for the sun. Her life had folded into mine. Who would I be when I was 15, 20, 30? Would I be as strong as she had been? As hungry for love? As desperate, determined and ashamed? I wouldn't know but I was already who I was gonna be. Someone like her, like my mama, a Boatwright, a bastard, a bastard out of Carolina."

Cast

 Jennifer Jason Leigh as Anney Boatwright
 Ron Eldard as Glen Waddell
 Glenne Headly as Ruth
 Lyle Lovett as Wade
 Jena Malone as Ruth Anne "Bone" Boatwright
 Kelsey Elizabeth Boulware as Bone at age 4
 Dermot Mulroney as Lyle Parsons
 Christina Ricci as Dee Dee
 Michael Rooker as Earle
 Diana Scarwid as Raylene
 Susan Traylor as Alma
 Grace Zabriskie as Granny
 Laura Dern as Narrator (voice over)
 Lindley Mayer as Reese
 Pat Hingle as Mr. Waddell
 Richard Todd Sullivan as Travis
 Jamison Stewart as Grey
 Timothy Stewart as Garvey
 Jeffrey Pillars as Truck Driver
 Rick Warner as Young Clerk
 Joe Maggard as Man at Cafe
 D.L. Anderson as Woman at Cafe
 Nelson George as Justice of the Peace
 Gene Dann as Worker
 Jim Gloster as Intern
 Derin Altay as Mrs. Parsons
 Sue Ellen Yates as Mr. Waddell's wife
 Sonny Shroyer as Sheriff
 Jerry Winsett as Brother Calvin
 J.C. Quinn as Officer
 Janice McQueen Ward as Neighbor (uncredited)

Reception
On Rotten Tomatoes the film has an approval rating of 100% based on reviews from 9 critics. On Metacritic the film has a score of 75% based on reviews from 11 critics, indicating "generally favorable reviews".

See also
 Child sexual abuse
 Illegitimacy in fiction

References

External links
 

1990s English-language films
1996 directorial debut films
1996 drama films
1996 films
Films about child abuse
Films about domestic violence
Films about dysfunctional families
Films based on American novels
Films directed by Anjelica Huston
Films scored by Van Dyke Parks
Films set in South Carolina
Films set in the 1940s
Films set in the 1950s
Films shot in North Carolina
Films about mother–daughter relationships
Showtime (TV network) films
Working-class culture in South Carolina
American drama television films
1990s American films